Kobayr is a 12th-century Armenian monastery located in the village Kobayr, directly across the road from the town of Tumanyan, within Lori marz, Armenia.

The monastery was built on a brink of a deep gorge, in 1171, by the Kyurikid princes, a junior branch of the Bagratuni royal house of Armenia.

In the 13th century, the monastery was acquired by the Zakarians, a noble Armenian dynasty at the service of Georgian royals. The Zakarians converted Kobayr into a Chalcedonian monastery, as a result of which the monastery stayed under the tutelage of the Georgian Orthodox Church for some time. This explains several Georgian inscriptions found on the walls of the monastery, which exist alongside the monastery's original Armenian inscriptions. The monastery houses the tomb of Prince Shanshe Zakarian, son of Ivane Zakarian. A bell tower in the middle of the complex was built in 1279 to house the tombs of Zakarian and his wife Vaneni. The monastery is currently undergoing renovation funded by the government of Armenia with the assistance of the government of Italy. The ruins of the main church in the monastery contain frescoes of Christ and the twelve apostles as well as the Church Fathers and other Christian figures.

Gallery

References

External links 

About Kobayr monastery

Eastern Orthodox monasteries in Armenia
Tourist attractions in Lori Province
Christian monasteries established in the 12th century
Oriental Orthodox congregations established in the 12th century
Buildings and structures in Lori Province